John V. Romita (born January 24, 1930) is an American comic book artist best known for his work on Marvel Comics' The Amazing Spider-Man and for co-creating characters including Mary Jane Watson, the Punisher, and Wolverine. Romita is the father of John Romita Jr., also a comic book artist and husband of Virginia Romita, for many years Marvel's traffic manager.

His first comics work was in 1949 as a ghost artist for Timely Comics, the precursor to Marvel, through which Romita met editor-in-chief Stan Lee. In 1951, Romita began drawing horror, war, and romance comics for Atlas Comics (previously Timely), and also drew his first superhero work, a 1950s revival of Captain America. He began working exclusively for DC Comics from 1958–1965 and was the artist for many of their romance comics. During these years, Romita further developed his ability to draw beautiful women, which he later became well-known for.

Romita joined Marvel in 1965, initially drawing Daredevil comics. In 1966, Spider-Man artist and co-creator Steve Ditko left Marvel, and Romita was chosen by writer Lee as the new artist for The Amazing Spider-Man title. Within a year of Romita becoming the Spider-Man artist, The Amazing Spider-Man rose from Marvel's second-best-selling title to the company's top-seller. Romita brought a new romance style to Spider-Man comics that soon became the new house style for the character. In June 1973, Romita was promoted to Marvel's art director and heavily influenced the look of Marvel comics throughout the 1970s and 1980s.

He was inducted into the Will Eisner Comic Book Hall of Fame in 2002.

Career

Early life and career
Romita was born and raised in Brooklyn, New York City, the son of Marie and Victor Romita, a baker, with three sisters and a brother. He is of Italian descent, from Sicily. He graduated from Manhattan's School of Industrial Art in 1947, having attended for three years after spending ninth grade at a Brooklyn junior high school. Among his instructors were book illustrator Howard Simon and magazine illustrator Ben Clements, and his influences included comics artists Noel Sickles, Roy Crane, Milton Caniff, and later, Alex Toth and Carmine Infantino, as well as commercial illustrators Jon Whitcomb, Coby Whitmore, and Al Parker. Caniff's Terry and the Pirates in particular was an early inspiration for Romita.

On Romita's 17th birthday, Romita received his first artist work from the Manhattan General Hospital. A anesthesiologist paid Romita $60 a week to create a medical exhibit on pneumatology medicine, which Romita completed in six months. Romita entered the comics industry in 1949 on the series Famous Funnies. "Steven Douglas up there was a benefactor to all young artists", Romita recalled. "The first story he gave me was a love story. It was terrible. All the women looked like emaciated men and he bought it, never criticized, and told me to keep working. He paid me two hundred dollars for it and never published it — and rightfully so".

Romita was working at the New York City company Forbes Lithograph in 1949, earning $30 a week, when comic-book inker Lester Zakarin, a friend from high school whom he ran into on a subway train, offered him either $17 or $20 a page to pencil a 10-page story for him as uncredited ghost artist. "I thought, this is ridiculous! In two pages I can make more money than I usually make all week! So I ghosted it and then kept on ghosting for him", Romita recalled. "I think it was a 1920s mobster crime story". The work was for Marvel's 1940s forerunner, Timely Comics, which helped give Romita an opportunity to meet editor-in-chief and art director Stan Lee. Romita ghost-penciled for Zakarin on Trojan Comics' Crime-Smashers and other titles, eventually signing some "Zakarin and Romita".

Atlas Comics

The collaboration ended in early 1951, when Romita was drafted into the U.S. Army. Taking the initiative prior to induction, he showed art samples to the base art director on Governors Island in New York Bay, who arranged for him to be stationed there to do layouts for recruitment posters once Romita had completed basic training at Fort Dix, New Jersey. Romita was promoted to corporal after seven or eight months; now allowed to live off the post, he rented an apartment in Brooklyn.

When not on duty, Romita could leave the base and go into Manhattan. In mid- to late 1951, he recalled in 2002, "I went uptown one day for lunch. I stopped over at Stan Lee's [office in the Empire State Building, where Timely Comics had by now evolved into Atlas Comics], and his secretary came out ... and I said, 'Stan doesn't know my name but I've worked for him for over a year'. I was in uniform! She must've told him this GI ... wants to do some comics. She said, 'Stan said here's a four-page science fiction story'. I penciled it and struggled with my first inking. That was the first story I did on my own. I did Westerns and war stories then".

Romita went on to draw a wide variety of horror comics, war comics, romance comics and other genres for Atlas. His most prominent work for the company was the short-lived 1950s revival of Timely's hit character Captain America, in Young Men #24–28 (Dec. 1953 – July 1954) and Captain America #76–78 (May–Sept. 1954). Romita had been offered the Captain America work by Lee after Mort Lawrence's art was deemed unsatisfactory. Additionally, Romita would render one of his first original characters, M-11 the Human Robot, in a five-page standalone science-fiction story in Menace #11 (May 1954). While not envisioned as an ongoing character, M-11 was resurrected decades later as a member of the super-hero team Agents of Atlas.

He was the primary artist for one of the first series with a black star, "Waku, Prince of the Bantu" — created by writer Don Rico and artist Ogden Whitney in the omnibus title Jungle Tales #1 (Sept. 1954). The ongoing short feature starred an African chieftain in Africa, with no regularly featured Caucasian characters. Romita succeeded Whitney with issue #2 (Nov. 1954).

DC Comics romance-comics artist
In the mid-1950s, while continuing to freelance for Atlas, Romita did uncredited work for DC Comics before transitioning to work for DC exclusively in 1958. His first known work for the company is the tentatively identified penciling credit for the cover of romance comic Secret Hearts #58 (Oct. 1959), and, confirmably, pencils for the seven-page story "I Know My Love", inked by Bernard Sachs, in Heart Throbs #63 (Jan. 1960). Other titles to which he contributed include Falling in Love, Girls' Love Stories, Girls' Romances, and Young Love.

"I was following the DC [house] style", he recalled in 2002. "Frequently they had another artist do the first page of my stories. Eventually I became their romance cover artist". He would "swipe"—an artists' term for using existing work as models, a common practice among novices—from movie stills and from the Milton Caniff comic strip Terry and the Pirates. Bernard Sachs and Sy Barry inked some of Romita's romance work, but "by the late '50s and early '60s, I was inking my own stuff". Romita had hoped a DC editor would eventually offer him a superhero comic, such as a Batman filler issue, but Romita remained on the romance titles.

Shortly afterward, however, romance comics began declining in popularity, and by 1965, DC had "stopped buying any new [romance] art", Romita recalled. "They had a large inventory of stories and continued with that and reprints. The other departments just never used me. I didn't go push myself in their face, either". Romita's last known DC story work was the six-page "My Heart Tricked Me", inked by Sachs, in Girls' Romances #121 (Dec. 1966), though his spot illustrations, some or all of it reprints of earlier work, continued to appear on one-page "beauty tip" and other filler pages, as well as on letters pages, through early 1970, as did the occasional reprinted story.

Joining Marvel Comics
Even before his final original DC story was published, Romita had already returned to freelance for what had now become Marvel Comics. His first work for Marvel was inking Jack Kirby's cover and Don Heck's interior pencils on the superhero-team comic The Avengers #23 (Dec. 1965).

Romita directed most of his efforts, however, toward finding advertising storyboard work. He obtained a position at the large ad agency BBDO through his friend Al Normandia, one of the firm's art directors. "They were going to pay me $250 a week. I'd made just over $200 a week with the romance [comics] but only by killing myself" with long hours of work. "It had become very hard for me to come up with new ideas. ... So I said, 'If I do any comics ... I'll do inking only. ... "

Marvel editor Stan Lee, however, had heard of Romita's leaving DC, and asked to see him. At "a three-hour lunch", Romita recalled, Lee promised to match the agency salary if Romita would come work for Marvel, and to give him flexibility to work at home or at the office on any given day at Romita's discretion. Though Romita felt he no longer wanted to pencil, in favor of being solely an inker, Lee soon enticed him otherwise:

Romita began a brief stint on Daredevil beginning with issue #12 (Jan. 1966), initially penciling over Jack Kirby's dynamic layouts as a means of learning Marvel's storytelling house style. Sales perked; while the title had a smaller print run than Marvel flagships The Amazing Spider-Man and Fantastic Four, it briefly had the company's highest percentage of sales compared to print-run. It also proved to be a stepping-stone for Romita's signature, years-long penciling run on The Amazing Spider-Man. "What Stan Lee wanted was for me to do a two-part Daredevil story [issues #16–17, May–June 1966] with Spider-Man as a guest star, to see how I handled the character".

Spider-Man

The reason for the tryout was the growing estrangement between Spider-Man co-creators Stan Lee and Steve Ditko. When Ditko abruptly left Marvel after completing The Amazing Spider-Man #38 (July 1966), Lee gave Romita the assignment. This followed Romita's eight-issue Daredevil run, the cover of the subsequent issue #20 (Sept. 1966), and an incidental Hulk and two Captain America stories (in Tales to Astonish #77, March 1966, and Tales of Suspense #76–77, April–May 1966, respectively). While Romita's depiction of Spider-Man would eventually become the company mascot and the definitive look to the general public, the artist had trepidations:

Lee later commented that this transition in Romita's style actually worked out for the benefit of the series, as it gradually weaned readers off the Ditko look while ultimately allowing Romita to work in the style he most excelled at. Romita took over The Amazing Spider-Man with issue #39 (Aug. 1966). His first inker on what would become Marvel's flagship series was Mike Esposito, who initially used the pseudonym "Mickey Demeo" to conceal from his regular employer, rival DC Comics, that he was moonlighting at Marvel. After three issues, Romita inked himself for issues #43–48 (Nov. 1966 – May 1967), before Esposito returned — uncredited for issue #49 (June 1967), then as Mickey Demeo until finally taking credit under his own name with issue #56 (Jan. 1968). Except for one issue (#65) inked by his successor, Jim Mooney, the Romita-Esposito team continued through issue #66 (Nov. 1968), establishing the new look of Spider-Man. The Amazing Spider-Man had been Marvel's second-best-selling title at the time Romita began drawing it. Within a year, it overtook Fantastic Four to become the company's top seller.

Romita designed the look of Mary Jane Watson, a supporting character in the Spider-Man series who would later become the lead character's romantic interest. Romita has stated that in designing Mary Jane, he "used Ann-Margret from the movie Bye Bye Birdie as a guide, using her coloring, the shape of her face, her red hair and her form-fitting short skirts." Mary Jane Watson made her first full appearance in The Amazing Spider-Man #42 (Nov. 1966), although she first appeared in #25 (June 1965) with her face obscured and had been mentioned since #15 (Aug. 1964). Peter David wrote in 2010 that Romita "made the definitive statement of his arrival by pulling Mary Jane out from behind the oversized potted plant [that blocked the readers' view of her face in issue #25] and placing her on panel in what would instantly become an iconic moment." Other characters that debuted in the Lee-Romita era include the Rhino in #41 (Oct. 1966), the Shocker in #46 (March 1967), the Kingpin in #50 (June 1967), and George Stacy in #56 (January 1968). Romita had based George Stacy on actor Charles Bickford. Lee and Romita's stories focused as much on the social and college lives of the characters as they did on Spider-Man's adventures. The stories became more topical, addressing issues such as the Vietnam War, political elections, and student activism.

Romita, increasingly called upon to do art corrections and touch-ups, and to interface with artists for ever-busy editor Lee, became Marvel's de facto art director. Cutting back on his Spider-Man workload, Romita began doing only layouts, with finished pencils by Don Heck or Jim Mooney for nearly every issue for a year-and-a-half (#57–75, Feb. 1968 – Aug. 1969). Romita then stepped back for six issues, drawing only covers while John Buscema laid out issues #76–81 (Sept. 1969 – Feb. 1970) for others to finish.

These steps at reducing Romita's Spider-Man workload had mixed results, Romita recalled in 2001, saying, "Stan was always trying to speed me up. He had Don Heck pencil over my breakdowns for a while. ... Then, when Don had finished the pencils, [Lee would] call me in to fix up anything ... that he didn't like. Even after it was inked, he'd have me changing what the inker had done. I told him, 'This was supposed to save me time, but it isn't!' ". Romita's initial run on the title, abetted by the three other artists, lasted through issue #95 (April 1971). Gil Kane succeeded him as Spider-Man's regular penciler through issue #105 (Feb. 1972). Romita then began a second stint, doing full pencils for issues #105–115 and #119 (Feb.–Dec. 1972, April 1974), and providing occasional inking and most of the cover art through issue #168 (May 1977). Romita suggested to writer Gerry Conway that supporting character Gwen Stacy should die at the hands of the Green Goblin in "The Night Gwen Stacy Died" in issue #121 (June 1973). Her demise and the Goblin's apparent death one issue later formed a story arc widely considered as the most defining in the history of Spider-Man.

In his original run on The Amazing Spider-Man, Romita contributed a string of over 50 covers and an almost unbroken run of story layouts or full pencil-art for 56 issues as well as a 21-page story in The Amazing Spider-Man Annual #3 (Nov. 1966), the covers of Annuals #5–7, and the covers and stories for the two issues of the magazine-format title The Spectacular Spider-Man (July and Nov. 1968) that themselves totaled 110 story pages, the equivalent of five-and-a-half issues.

Comics-art historian Daniel Herman assessed of Romita's Spider-Man work,

Romita was the artist for the Spider-Man newspaper comic strip from its launch on January 3, 1977 through late 1980. He continued in his role as Marvel's art director during this time, anticipating that the strip would not last. Romita had promised Lee that he would continue the comic strip as long as sales continued to grow. At the start of the fourth year, the strip's number had begun to stagnate and then decline.

Marvel Comics art director
After editor-in-chief and art director Stan Lee assumed the positions of publisher and president in 1972, he promoted Romita to the position of art director in July 1973 after Romita had been in that position unofficially but on staff since 1972. In that capacity through at least the late 1980s, Romita played a major role in defining the look of Marvel Comics and in designing new characters. Among the characters he designed or helped design are the Punisher, Wolverine, Luke Cage, Bullseye, Tigra, and Brother Voodoo. Romita's catlike design for Wolverine was based on an encyclopedia description he found on wolverines, as vicious short animals with claws. For the Punisher, a rough sketch was provided by writer Gerry Conway, with a skull and crossbones on the chest. Feeling this was too simple, Romita made the skull larger and encompass the Punisher's torso, with the cheekbones aligning with his pecs and his belt buckle resembling teeth. Romita also designed Natasha Romanova's Black Widow outfit, inspired by Miss Fury.

In 1976, Romita did uncredited art corrections on the large-format, first DC/Marvel intercompany crossover, Superman vs. the Amazing Spider-Man, over the pencils of Ross Andru. Later that same year, Romita inked Jack Kirby's pencil work on Captain America's Bicentennial Battles, a one-shot story published in an oversized treasury format. Around 1980, Romita's art directing duties expanded from comic books to special projects. His duties included supervising and hiring other artists, providing corrections and cover sketches when needed, and drawing art for various merchandise.

Later career
Romita inked the debut of new Captain Marvel Monica Rambeau in The Amazing Spider-Man Annual #16 (1982) and the first appearance of the Hobgoblin in The Amazing Spider-Man #238 (March 1983). He was one of six pencilers on Peter Parker, the Spectacular Spider-Man #121 (Dec. 1986), and he penciled the nine-page story "I Remember Gwen" in The Amazing Spider-Man #365 (Aug. 1992, the 30th-anniversary issue) and an eight-page backup story starring the hero and supporting character the Prowler in Peter Parker, the Spectacular Spider-Man Annual #13 (1993).

He both penciled and inked the 10-page backup story "The Kiss"—a flashback in which Peter Parker (Spider-Man) and his girlfriend Gwen Stacy share their first kiss—in Webspinners: Tales of Spider-Man #1 (Jan. 1999). He drew an alternate-universe version of the Spider-Man characters in the one-shot Spidey: A Universe X Special (2001), and penciled the final four pages of the 38-page story in the milestone The Amazing Spider-Man #500 (Dec. 2003). Romita drew one of four covers to the April 27 – May 3, 2002 issue of TV Guide.

Additionally, Romita contributed to multi-artist jams in commemorative issues. He did a panel in Captain America vol. 3, #50 (Feb. 2002), starring the first Marvel superhero he had drawn; a portion of Iron Man vol. 3, #40 (May 2001), although the hero was not one of the artist's signature characters; a panel for Daredevil vol. 2, #50 (Oct. 2003); and a few pages featuring Karen Page in Daredevil vol. 2, #100 (Oct. 2007), done in the style of the romance comics he had drawn decades earlier. Romita both penciled and inked the cover of Daredevil vol. 2, #94 (Feb. 2007) in that same romance comics style. The following year he drew a variant cover of his signature series, for The Amazing Spider-Man #568 (Oct. 2008), doing so again with #642 (Nov. 2010).

A Romita image of Spider-Man and a Hulk image penciled by Rich Buckler and inked by Romita were among the "Marvel Super Heroes" set of commemorative stamps issued by the U.S. Postal Service on July 27, 2007.

As of 2013, he serves on the Disbursement Committee of the comic-book industry charity The Hero Initiative.

Stan Lee interviewed Romita and his son for the documentary series The Comic Book Greats.

Awards
Romita received an Inkpot Award in 1979 and was inducted into the Will Eisner Award Hall of Fame in 2002. Romita was inducted into the Inkwell Awards Joe Sinnott Hall of Fame in 2020.

Personal life
John Romita Sr. married childhood sweetheart Virginia Bruno in November 1952, who also worked on staff at Marvel from 1975 to 1996. They lived in Brooklyn's Bensonhurst neighborhood until 1954, when they bought a house in the Queens neighborhood of Queens Village. Some years later, the family moved to Bellerose, New York, on Long Island.

He and his wife have two sons, Victor and John Jr. (born August 17, 1956), who followed in his footsteps to become a noted comic-book artist himself.

Bibliography

DC Comics
 DC 100 Page Super Spectacular #5 (1971)
 Falling in Love #31, 35, 50, 53–55, 70, 81 (1959–1966)
 Girls' Love Stories #82–88, 90–99, 101, 116, 120, 138, 140, 162, 165, 170 (1961–1972)
 Girls' Romances #23, 62, 76, 85, 93–95, 114, 121, 129, 159–160 (1953–1971)
 Heart Throbs #63, 65–67, 77–86, 90, 93, 99, 101 (1959–1966)
 Secret Hearts #43, 60, 69–70, 78–93, 109, 152–153 (1957–1971)
 Young Love #39–43, 45–54 (1963–1966)
 Young Romance #125–128, 130–132, 171–172, 175 (1963–1971)

Marvel Comics

 Adventures into Weird Worlds #21 (1953)
 All-True Crime #44 (1951)
 The Amazing Spider-Man #39–58, 67, 72, 82–83, 87–88, 93–95, 106–119, 132, 365, 500 Annual '96 #1 (as penciller); #89–92, 96, 120–125, 146, 151, 238, 247, 274, 400, Annual #16 (as inker only) (1966–2003) (Romita drew additional Silver Age issues as layout artist for pencilers Don Heck and Jim Mooney.)
 The Amazing Spider-Man vol. 2, #18 (inker) (2000)
 The Amazing Spider-Man Special Edition (1982)
 The Amazing Spider-Man comic strip (1977–1980)
 Astonishing #7, 18, 24, 43, 57, 61 (1951–1957)
 The Avengers #23 (inker) (1965)
 Battle #14, 26, 39, 45, 49, 53, 57–59 (1952–1958)
 Battle Action #20, 22, 25, 27, 29 (1955–1957)
 Battlefront #6, 10 (1952–1953)
 Battle Ground #9 (1956)
 Black Knight #4 (1955)
 Captain America #114, 138–145, 148 (1969–1972)
 Captain America vol. 3 #50 (among other artists) (2002)
 Captain America Comics #76–78 (1954)
 Caught #2 (1956)
 Combat #3, 6 (1952)
 Commando Adventures #2 (1957)
 Cowboy Action #10 (1956)
 Crime Cases Comics #7 (1951)
 Crime Exposed #5 (1951)
 Daredevil #12–19 (1966)
 Daredevil vol. 2 #50, 100 (among other artists) (2003–2007)
 Doctor Strange vol. 2 #7 (inker) (1975)
 Droids #1–4 (1986)
 Fantastic Four #103–106, 108 (1970–1971)
 Frontier Western #7 (1957)
 Gunsmoke Western #38 (1956)
 The Incredible Hulk Annual #17 (1991)
 Journey into Unknown Worlds #22 (1953)
 Jungle Action #2–6 (1954–1955)
 Justice #42 (1954)
 Kid Colt Outlaw #70 (1957)
 Kingpin #1 (1997)
 Lorna, the Jungle Girl #17–26 (1956–1957)
 Love Romances #35, 37 (1954)
 Marines in Battle #3–4, 19 (1954–1957)
 Marvel Presents: Guardians of the Galaxy #3 (inker, Cover Art) (February 1976)
 Marvel Romance Redux: But I Thought He Loved Me #1 (inker) (2006)
 Marvel Romance Redux: Guys & Dolls #1 (inker) (2006)
 Marvel Romance Redux: Love is a Four-Letter Word #1 (2006)
 Marvel Tales #108 (1952)
 Marvel Tales vol. 2 #81 (1977)
 Marvel Treasury Special #2 ("Captain America's Bicentennial Battles") (inker) (1976)
 Men's Adventures #22, 24, 28 (1953–1954)
 Menace #3, 6, 8, 11 (1953–1954)
 My Love #1–3, 14, 16 (1969–1972)
 My Love Story #9 (1957)
 My Own Romance #36, 40 (1954)
 Mystery Tales #7, 37, 41 (1953–1956)
 Mystic #11, 15, 23, 25 (1952–1953)
 Navy Action #5 (1955)
 Navy Combat #12 (1957)
 Our Love Story #1–2, 5 (inker) (1969–1970)
 Outlaw Kid #5 (1955)
 Questprobe #1 (inker) (1984)
 Ringo Kid #11 (1956)
 Savage Tales (Femizons) #1 (1971)
 Secret Story Romances #16, 18 (1955)
 Sergio Aragonés Massacres Marvel #1 (inker) (1996)
 Six-Gun Western #1, 4 (1957)
 Spaceman #1 (1953)
 The Spectacular Spider-Man #121, Annual #13 (1986–1993)
 The Spectacular Spider-Man magazine #1–2 (1968)
 Spellbound #13, 24, 26–28 (1953–1956)
 Spider-Man #57 (penciller) (1995)
 Spider-Man: The Mutant Agenda #0 (1994)
 Spy Cases #5 (1951)
 Stories of Romance #5, 11 (1956–1957)
 Strange Tales #4, 35 (1951–1955)
 Strange Tales of the Unusual #1 (1955)
 Suspense #20, 25 (1952)
 Tales of Suspense (Captain America) #76–77 (1966)
 Tales to Astonish #67 (Giant Man); #77 (Hulk) (inker) (1965–1966)
 The Tomb of Dracula magazine #2 (inker) (1979)
 True Secrets #4, 13, 38 (1951–1956)
 Two Gun Western #8 (inker) (1951)
 Ultimate Spider-Man Super Special #1 (2002)
 Uncanny Tales #10 (1953)
 Uncanny X-Men #177 (inker) (1984)
 Universe X: Spidey #1 (inker) (2001)
 Untold Tales of Spider-Man #-1 (1997)
 Vampire Tales #2 (1973)
 War Action #10–11 (1953)
 War Adventures #7, 9 (1952)
 War Comics #10, 16, 20, 29, 40, 42 (1952–1956)
 Web of Spider-Man #52 (inker) (1989)
 Webspinners: Tales of Spider-Man #1 (1999)
 Western Kid #1–17 (1954–1957)
 Western Outlaws #1, 7, 11, 13–14 (1954–1956)
 Western Outlaws and Sheriffs #70 (1951)
 Wild Western #24 (1952)
 World of Mystery #2 "(1956)
 World of Suspense #5 (1956)
 Young Men #24–28 (Captain America) (1953–1954)

Marvel Comics and DC Comics
 Superman vs. the Amazing Spider-Man #1 (1976)

Notes

References

Sources

External links

 
 John Romita Sr. at Mike's Amazing World of Comics
 John Romita Sr. at the Unofficial Handbook of Marvel Comics Creators

1930 births
Living people
American art directors
American comics artists
American people of Italian descent
American storyboard artists
Artists from Brooklyn
Golden Age comics creators
High School of Art and Design alumni
Inkpot Award winners
Marvel Comics people
People from Bellerose, New York
Silver Age comics creators
United States Army soldiers
Will Eisner Award Hall of Fame inductees